Robert Townshend (1580–?), of Raynham, Norfolk, was an English politician.

He was a Member (MP) of the Parliament of England for Castle Rising in 1601 and 1604.

References

1580 births
Year of death missing
People from Raynham, Norfolk
English MPs 1601
English MPs 1604–1611